N-Acetylglycinamide is a glycine derivative.

See also
 Acetylglycinamide chloral hydrate
 N-Acetylglycine

References

Acetamides